John Skinner (by 1509 – 16 November 1571), of Reigate, Surrey, was an English politician.

He was a Member (MP) of the Parliament of England for Reigate in 1542 and for Surrey in 1555 and 1558.

References

1571 deaths
Year of birth uncertain
English MPs 1542–1544
English MPs 1555
English MPs 1558
People from Reigate